Grove City is an unincorporated community in Christian County, Illinois, United States.

It has been rumored that Bonnie and Clyde used a house in Grove City as a hideout while running from the law. The house still stands today, however, it is in very poor condition.

The Grove City Methodist Cemetery is located in Mount Auburn Township.

Frank P. Sadler (1872–1931), Illinois state senator and lawyer, lived on a farm near Grove City.

References

Unincorporated communities in Christian County, Illinois
Unincorporated communities in Illinois